Skolkovo is a railway station of Line D1 of the Moscow Central Diameters and the Belorussky suburban railway line in Moscow Oblast. It was opened on 27 May 2019.

Gallery

References

Railway stations in Moscow Oblast
Railway stations of Moscow Railway
Line D1 (Moscow Central Diameters) stations